The Giardino Botanico Alpino "Bruno Peyronel" (about 17,000 m2) is a botanical garden and nature preserve specializing in alpine plants. It is located at an altitude of 2290 meters in the Colle Barant of Val Pellice, Bobbio Pellice, Metropolitan City of Turin, Piedmont, Italy.

The garden opened in 1991 with a dedication to the memory of Bruno Peyronel (1919-1982), naturalist and botanist. Today it contains over 300 species of indigenous alpine plants, many of them marked with individual signs, amidst mountain environments ranging from various types of pasture and wetlands through stony areas, ridges, and debris. Species include Carex sempervirens, Dryas octopetala, Festuca violacea, and Salix herbacea.

See also 
 List of botanical gardens in Italy

References 
 Giardino Botanico Alpino "Bruno Peyronel"
 Giardino Botanico Alpino "Bruno Peyronel"
 Touring Club Italiano, L'Italia dei giardini, Touring Editore, 2005, page 17. .
 BGCI entry
 Comunità Montana Val Pellice (Italian)
 Traspi.net article (Italian)

Botanical gardens in Italy
Gardens in Piedmont
Buildings and structures in the Metropolitan City of Turin
Metropolitan City of Turin